Niobium(V) bromide is the inorganic compound with the formula Nb2Br10. Its name comes from the compound's empirical formula, NbBr5.  It is a diamagnetic, orange solid that hydrolyses readily.  The compound adopts an edge-shared bioctahedral structure, which means that two NbBr5 units are joined by a pair of bromide bridges. There is no bond between the Nb centres.  Niobium(V) chloride, niobium(V) iodide, tantalum(V) chloride, tantalum(V) bromide, and tantalum(V) iodide all share this structural motif.

Synthesis
Niobium(V) bromide can be prepared by the reaction of bromine with niobium metal at 230-250 °C in a tube furnace.  It can also be produced from the more accessible oxide by metathesis using aluminium tribromide:
Nb2O5  + 3.3AlBr3  →  2NbBr5  +  3.3Al2O3 
A challenge with the latter method is the occurrence of NbOBr3 as an impurity.

References

External links
Web Elements

Bromides
Metal halides
Niobium(V) compounds